Macrochlidia is a genus of moths belonging to the family Tortricidae.

Species
Macrochlidia azuayana Razowski & Pelz, 2007
Macrochlidia cajanumana Razowski & Pelz, 2005 
Macrochlidia leucoatra Razowski & Pelz, 2007
Macrochlidia major Brown, 1990 
Macrochlidia minor Brown, 1990
Macrochlidia monotona (Razowski & Pelz, 2005)

References

 , 1991, Journal of the New York Entomological Society 99: 701.
 , 2005, World Catalogue of Insects volume 5 Tortricidae
 , 2007, Notes and descriptions of some Neotropical Chlidanotini (Lepidoptera: Tortricidae), Entomologische Zeitung 117 (3): 127-131

External links
tortricidae.com

Chlidanotini
Tortricidae genera